The 1990 United States Senate election in Colorado took place on November 6, 1990. Incumbent Republican senator William L. Armstrong did not seek re-election to another term. Republican nominee Hank Brown won the open seat, defeating Democratic nominee Josie Heath.

Major candidates

Democratic 
 Josie Heath, former Boulder County Commissioner
 Carlos F. Lucero

Republican 
 Hank Brown, U.S. Representative for Colorado's 4th congressional district

Results

See also 
 1990 United States Senate elections

References 

Colorado
1990
1990 Colorado elections